Oddvar Brå (born 16 March 1951) is a Norwegian former cross-country skier. He was among the best skiers in Norway, the three-times winner of the World Cup (1972–73, then named "World ranking", 1974–75 and 1978–79) and the winner of 16 national championships. His success in the major international championships was more modest.

Career
Brå participated in the 1972 Winter Olympics and the 1991 Holmenkollen ski festival, but his first individual major international win was at the 1982 FIS Nordic World Ski Championships in Oslo, where he won the 15 km event. In this championship, he also tied for the gold medal with Alexander Zavyalov of the Soviet Union in the relay after a dramatic finish in which his pole broke. This event remained in the memory of most Norwegians, leading to the popular all-Norwegian expression "Hvor var du da Brå brakk staven?" ("Where were you when Brå’s pole broke?").

Brå also won three relay medals at the FIS Nordic World Ski Championships with a gold in 1982 and bronzes in 1974 and 1978. Brå additionally won two silver medals in the 4 × 10 km relay at the 1972 Winter Olympics and the 1980 Winter Olympics, the 15 km at the Holmenkollen ski festival in 1980 and 1982, and the 50 km in 1975, 1979, and 1981. In 1975, Brå was awarded the Holmenkollen medal (shared with Gerhard Grimmer and Ivar Formo).

Brå's best individual achievement in the Olympics was a fourth place in the 15 km event in the 1988 Winter Olympics in Calgary. He received the Egebergs Ærespris in 1987 for his accomplishments in cross-country skiing and athletics.

Cross-country skiing results
All results are sourced from the International Ski Federation (FIS).

Olympic Games
 2 medals – (2 silver)

World Championships
 4 medals – (2 gold, 2 bronze)

World Cup

Season standings

Individual podiums
 2 victories 
 4 podiums

Team podiums
 1 victory
 1 podium

Note:  Until the 1999 World Championships, World Championship races were included in the World Cup scoring system.

References

 - click Holmenkollmedaljen for downloadable pdf file 
 - click Vinnere for downloadable pdf file

External links

1951 births
Cross-country skiers at the 1972 Winter Olympics
Cross-country skiers at the 1976 Winter Olympics
Cross-country skiers at the 1980 Winter Olympics
Cross-country skiers at the 1984 Winter Olympics
Cross-country skiers at the 1988 Winter Olympics
Holmenkollen medalists
Holmenkollen Ski Festival winners
Living people
Norwegian male cross-country skiers
Olympic cross-country skiers of Norway
Olympic silver medalists for Norway
Place of birth missing (living people)
Olympic medalists in cross-country skiing
FIS Nordic World Ski Championships medalists in cross-country skiing
Medalists at the 1980 Winter Olympics
Medalists at the 1972 Winter Olympics
People from Melhus
Sportspeople from Trøndelag